Khushab is a city in Punjab, Pakistan.

Khushab may also refer to:
Khushab District, a district of Punjab (Pakistan)
Khushab Tehsil, a tehsil of district Khushab
Khushab Junction railway station, a railway station in Punjab region.

See also
Khushab Nuclear Complex, a plutonium production complex.
Khvoshab (disambiguation), several places in Iran